The Hundred of Booleroo is a cadastral hundred of the County of Frome in South Australia, centred on the eponymous township of Booleroo Centre. It was proclaimed by Governor Anthony Musgrave in 1875 and named for an indigenous term bulyeroo or bulyaroo, thought to mean "plenty" or "soft mud and clay".

Local government
The District Council of Port Germein established in 1888 brought local government to the Hundred of Booleroo several neighbouring hundreds to the west. In 1980 the hundred became a part of the District Council of Mount Remarkable, which was formed by amalgamation of Wilmington and Port Germein councils.

References

Booleroo